Hernando County School District is a government school district headquartered in Brooksville, Florida, United States. The district covers Hernando County.

Schools
As of the 2017–2018 school year, there are 28 schools in the Hernando County School District: 10 elementary schools, 4 middle schools, 3 K-8 schools, 5 high schools, 2 educational centers, 1 eSchool and 3 charter schools.

Elementary schools

Brooksville Elementary School
Chocachatti Elementary School
Deltona Elementary School
Eastside Elementary School
Moton Elementary School
Pine Grove Elementary School
Spring Hill Elementary School
Suncoast Elementary School
Westside Elementary School
John D. Floyd Elementary School

Middle schools

Dolores S. Parrott Middle School
Fox Chapel Middle School
Powell Middle School
West Hernando Middle School

K-8 Schools

Challenger K-8 
Explorer K-8
Winding Waters K-8

High schools

Hernando High School (Leopard) (1889)
Frank W. Springstead High School (Eagle) (1976)
Central High School (Bear) (1988)
Nature Coast Technical High School (Shark) (2003)
Weeki Wachee High School (Hornet) (2010)

Charter schools

Brooksville Engineering, Science and Technology(BEST) Academy
Gulf Coast Academy of Science and Technology
Gulf Coast Middle School

Other centers

Endeavor and Discovery Academies
Hernando eSchool
Springs Coast Environmental Center

References

External links

 Hernando County School Board

School Board
School districts in Florida